Sheryl Tittlemier (born 26 November 1974) is a Canadian woman cricketer. She played for Canada at the 2013 ICC Women's World Twenty20 Qualifier.

She was a ballplayer and got into the national team in 2008 during a 13-day tour to Trinidad and Tobago in 2008. She was part of the Canadian team which lost to United States in the 2010 ICC Americas Qualifier final by 7 wickets.

References

External links 
 

1974 births
Living people
Canadian women cricketers
Sportspeople from Selkirk, Manitoba